Pardosa californica is a species of wolf spider in the family Lycosidae. It is found in the United States and Mexico.

References

californica
Articles created by Qbugbot
Spiders described in 1887